Xiaojie may refer to:

xiǎojiě, a Chinese honorific for miss
xiǎojiě, a Mandarin Chinese profanity for prostitute

People
 Wang Xiaojie (died 697), general of the Chinese dynasty Tang
 Xiǎo Jié or Liljay (born 1986), Taiwanese singer and a member of JPM
  (born 1989), athletics competitor